TOPIO ("TOSY Ping Pong Playing Robot") is a bipedal humanoid robot designed to play table tennis against a human being.  It has been developed since 2005 by TOSY, a robotics firm in Vietnam. It was publicly demonstrated at the Tokyo International Robot Exhibition (IREX) on November 28, 2007.   TOPIO 3.0 (the latest version of TOPIO) stands approximately 1.88 m (6' 2") tall and weighs 120 kg (264 lb).

Development history

Specifications

Technologies 
 Recognition of fast moving objects
 Artificial Intelligence
 Low Inertia mechanical system
 Fast and accurate movement control
 Balanced bipedal walking

See also 

Humanoid robot
Actroid
Android
ASIMO
Gynoid
REEM
QRIO
HUBO
HRP-4C

References

External links 

 
 TOPIO video - YouTube
 "I, the Ping Pong Robot" - Softpedia
 "Ping Pong Playing Robots" - www.robots.net
 "TOPIO - The Ping Pong Playing Robot" - www.robotliving.com
 "Play ping-pong or feed the baby at Tokyo robot fair" - Reuters

Bipedal humanoid robots
Sports robots
Robotics at TOSY
2005 robots